Robert Lovenheim is a film and television writer and producer.

Biography
Lovenheim is a television producer. He studied film at the University of Southern California, and his career began at Columbia Pictures where he supervised new development and feature films. He then moved into the television arm of Columbia to head long-form development of series and miniseries. He has executive produced as an independent producer over 35 movies such as A Smoky Mountain Christmas
starring Dolly Parton as well as mini-series and TV pilots for HBO, CBS, ABC and NBC. His productions have won numerous awards including an  Emmy.  He is the founder of  Movie With Me a movie site specializing in foreign and independent films.

TV movies produced
The O.J. Simpson Story (1995).... executive producer
A Family Torn Apart (1993)....executive producer
The Last of His Tribe (1992)....producer
The Revenge of Al Capone (1989)....producer
A Smoky Mountain Christmas (1987)....producer 
The Defiant Ones (1986)....producer 
Gladiator (1986)....producer
Shattered Vows (1985)....producer
Starcrossed (1985)....producer
Off Sides (1984)....producer
Fire on the Mountain (1981)....producer
A Whale for the Killing (1981)....producer
Happily Ever After (1979)....producer
Long Journey Back (1979)....producer
Telethon (1978)....producer
Minstrel Man (1977)....producer
Promise Him Anything (1975)....producer
Larry (1974)....producer

TV series produced
Big Shamus, Little Shamus (1979).....producer
Dirty Dancing....producer
Lottery! (1983-1984)....producer
Sledge Hammer! (1986-1988)....executive producer

TV mini-series produced
Elvis and Me (1988)....producer

TV specials produced
Sheriff and the Astronaut (1984)....producer
Gabe and Walker (1981)....producer
Newman's Drugstore (1976)....producer

References

Living people
American film producers
American male writers
USC School of Cinematic Arts alumni
Year of birth missing (living people)